Hertford East railway station is the northern terminus of the Hertford East branch line off the West Anglia Main Line in the east of England, and is located in the town of Hertford in Hertfordshire. It is  down the line from London Liverpool Street and is one of two stations in the town, the other being  on the Hertford Loop Line. Its three-letter station code is HFE.

The station and all trains calling are operated by Greater Anglia.

There are two platforms, although platform number one is generally only used during peak times, during times of disruption and primarily for trains to and from Stratford station.

History
The first station opened on 31st October 1843 sited to the east of the present station.
The current station, designed by W. N. Ashbee, was opened by the Great Eastern Railway on 27 February 1888, replacing the first station. The station was listed in 1974 as a Grade II* listed building; in 1996 the buffer stop lights on platform 1 were separately listed in their own right.

The Grade II listed signal box at the station was dismantled in October 2021 to allow for platform extensions. It will be relocated to the Wensleydale Railway.

Services

The typical Monday-Saturday off-peak service is two trains per hour to London Liverpool Street via Tottenham Hale.

The typical morning peak service is three trains per hour, two of which are for Liverpool Street via Seven Sisters and one is for Stratford via Tottenham Hale.  The typical evening peak service is three trains an hour, two of which are for Liverpool Street via Tottenham Hale and one of which is for Broxbourne.

The typical service on a Sunday is two trains per hour to Stratford via Tottenham Hale.
.

Services are generally formed of Class 720 units.

Oyster and contactless cards are accepted at the station.

Proposed developments
Some options of the proposed East West Rail involve reopening a route between Hertford East railway station and Hertford North railway station; however a 2009 discussion paper noted that while "the new connection appears technically feasible, doubts must be cast over its public acceptability and deliverability".

In popular culture
Hertford East doubles as Yeovil Railway Station in the 1960 film School for Scoundrels, seen in the opening titles and closing credits.

References

External links

Railway stations in Hertfordshire
DfT Category E stations
Former Great Eastern Railway stations
Railway stations in Great Britain opened in 1888
Greater Anglia franchise railway stations
Buildings and structures in Hertford
Grade II listed railway stations
William Neville Ashbee railway stations